John Sargent Rockwell (born September 16, 1940) is an American music critic, dance critic and arts administrator. According to Grove Music Online, "Rockwell brings two signal attributes to his critical work: a genuine admiration for all kinds of music and the arts, and the ability to fit a spirit of inquiry and enthusiasm for newer approaches to music into a reasoned overview of cultural history".

Early life and education
John Sargent Rockwell was born on September 16, 1940 to San Francisco attorney Alvin J. Rockwell (1908–1999) and Anna S. Hayward (1906–1983). He studied at Phillips Academy, Harvard University, the University of Munich, and the University of California, Berkeley, earning a Ph.D. in German cultural history.

Career
Rockwell began his journalistic career at the Oakland Tribune and the Los Angeles Times. In 1972 he began writing at The New York Times, first as a classical music critic and reporter, then also as the paper's chief pop music critic, and, from 1992 to 1994, as the European cultural correspondent. Between 1994 and 1998, he served as the first director of the Lincoln Center Festival. Rockwell returned to The New York Times to become the editor of the paper's Sunday Arts and Leisure section. In 2004, he was named the chief dance critic. He left the Times at the end of 2006 to pursue independent projects.

Rockwell got his start in radio journalism at WHRB at Harvard and at KPFA in Berkeley. On WNYC Radio, Rockwell examined cultural topics and events in the news for his weekly Monday-night segment, "Rockwell Matters", from October 2007 until May 2008.

In January 2008, Rockwell was a Distinguished Visitor at the American Academy in Berlin. He is a Chevalier of the French Order of Arts & Letters.

Personal life
Rockwell currently lives in Manhattan with his wife, Linda Mevorach. Their daughter, Sasha, resides in California.

Books

References

1940 births
Living people
20th-century American journalists
American dance critics
American male journalists
American music critics
American music journalists
Chevaliers of the Ordre des Arts et des Lettres
Harvard University alumni
Ludwig Maximilian University of Munich alumni
People from Washington, D.C.
The New York Times people
University of California, Berkeley alumni
Writers from New York (state)